Greatest Hits & Remixes is a compilation album by British electronic producer and disc jockey Paul Oakenfold, featuring both old and new tracks and remixes from Oakenfold, released in 2007 commemorating his 100th official remix. The album was released in November in the United Kingdom with a double CD set and a triple CD version with the same number of songs, it was also released in the United States with only 20 tracks in one CD, it featured some remixes from the original version but it also included, two new remixes which are; Justin Timberlake's "My Love" song and his remix of Hans Zimmer's "Jack Theme Suite" which was used for the film Pirates of the Caribbean: At World's End (2007). Releases with the catalogue number "UL 1602-2" included a bonus DVD of a live show and a documentary on Oakenfold.

Reception

The album received positive reception from music critics. AllMusic were favourable, saying that by the release of his album, "his standing as a giant in the history of the [dance and electronica] genre had been confirmed. This dazzling compilation plays as a testament to Oakenfold's contributions, from his remixes of stadium rockers (U2, Madonna, and Radiohead) to classic rave (Underworld) to trip hop (Massive Attack) to originals, Oakenfold's knob-twiddling wizardry is unparalleled, and the delicious grooves and sonic textures of this retrospective attest to the fact." Exclaim.ca were favourable, saying Oakenfold has "got a grasp of the mathematics of tracks and how they are formed to the degree that, as a remix artist, his enhancement of the music generally comes naturally. There are also some original tracks by Oakenfold as well," instructing readers to "get it". AbsolutePunk rated the album 8.4/10, saying "Oakenfold’s arrangements have bold sonic streaks and digital beats which fit the club music standard while indulging in his imagination and fascination with electronica based music." PopMatters rated the album six stars out of ten, saying, "ironically, Oakenfold’s Greatest Hits is a hit-or miss affair, swerving violently from big-beat pleasure spots to bloated paycheck-padding remixes (and Richard Norris' ego-pumping liner note essay certainly doesn’t make matters any better). Oakenfold’s massive popularity has been both his greatest gift as well as his greatest curse. At the end of the day, the only person that Oakenfold is trying to impress is the one shaking everything they got on the dancefloor. If that person is you, then pick up Greatest Hits & Remixes and call it a day." Resident Advisor wondered why Grace's "Not Over Yet" was absent from the compilation, but stated the compilation "gives a quick overview of Oakenfold's 20-year career."

The album was also successful commercially, reaching number 13 on the UK Compilation Chart. The following year, Oakenfold would release another retrospective, Oakenfold Anthems (2008), focused not only on material by himself but material from his label Perfecto Records.

Track listing

UK 2xCD version

UK 3xCD version

US version

Credits
 Booklet Photography: Bjoern Kommerell
 Cover Image Photography: Grant Fleming

Charts

Weekly charts

Year-end charts

Releases

References

2007 greatest hits albums
2007 remix albums
Paul Oakenfold compilation albums
Paul Oakenfold remix albums